Talcamávida is a town in the commune of Hualqui in the Biobío Region of Chile. It is located on the north bank of the Bio Bio River across from Santa Juana on the opposite shore. It occupied a plain along the river  from the Pacific Ocean that is part of a small valley surrounded by to the north by a high wooded mountainous area.

To the north of Talcamávida was the Quilacoya River and riachuelo of  Millahue, in whose valleys and mountains Pedro de Valdivia forced the people of the Moluche rehue of Quilacoya to work in the rich gold mines there.  His successor García Hurtado de Mendoza was the first that established a small fort there in 1560.  It was destroyed more than once by the neighboring natives, and was rebuilt under the government of Pedro Porter Casanate.  It was not settled until the time of the governor Manuel de Amat y Junyent, who rebuilt the fort again and populated it as the town of San Rafael de Talcamávida, in 1756.  In 1821 it was burned by the same royalist force that set fire to Santa Juana. In 1872 it became a rail station on the line between Concepcion and San Rosendo.

See also
 List of towns in Chile

References 

  Francisco Solano Asta-Buruaga y Cienfuegos, Diccionario geográfico de la República de Chile, D. Appleton y Compania, Nueva York, 1899, Pg.787 Talcamávida

Populated places in Concepción Province
Populated places established in 1756
1750s establishments in the Captaincy General of Chile
1756 establishments in the Viceroyalty of Peru